Omar Nazar is an Afghan footballer who last played for VfL Lohbrügge.

National team statistics

References

Afghan footballers
Afghan expatriate footballers
1978 births
Living people
Association football midfielders
Footballers from Kabul
Afghanistan international footballers